Ireland–Pakistan relations are the political, economic and cultural relations between Ireland and Pakistan. Ireland is accredited to Pakistan by its embassy in Ankara, Turkey. Pakistan had an embassy  in Dublin.

History

Pakistan established its embassy in Dublin on 1 March 2001.

In April 2004 while Ireland had the Presidency of the European Council representing the EU on the world stage, Irish European Affairs Minister Dick Roche said that the EU should engage with Pakistan to bolster its democracy.

In December 2004, Humayun Akhtar Khan, Pakistani Minister for Commerce accompanied by Tariq Iqbal Puri, the Economic Minister of the Embassy of Pakistan in Brussels, met with the Irish Minister responsible for trade policy, Michael Ahern in the Irish Department of Enterprise, Trade & Employment. The Pakistani commerce minister briefed the Irish about the improving economic conditions in Pakistan and government reforms in the economic sector.

Irish aid

In 2005, Ireland provided €5 million to Pakistan in relief aid after an earthquake in Kashmir.

In April 2007, a memorandum of understanding was signed for the establishment of a Pakistan-Ireland Joint Business Council by Zubair F. Tufail, President Ghulam Bari and Secretary Yousaf Sharee from Association of Pakistanis in Ireland. Chairman of the Ireland-Pakistan Business Council in the presence of Michael Ahren, Irish Minister for International Trade, T.D and Irish Ambassador in Islamabad.

Trade

Pakistan's trade with Ireland significantly increased between 2004 and 2007. Major Pakistani exports to Ireland included cotton fabrics, made-ups articles of textile material, carpets, rugs and surgical instruments.

Pakistanis in Ireland

There is a sizable community of Pakistanis in Ireland, mostly consisting of doctors and other medics and their families. Due to a longtime shortage of doctors in Ireland, the country has incorporated many foreign doctors from countries like Pakistan going as far back as the late 1980s and early 1990s. The 2016 official census in Ireland recorded 12,891 Pakistani born people living in Ireland. There is a sizable population of Pakistani people spread throughout the country. In March 23 2021 Pakistani Community Launched their Community web portal (www.Pakistani.irish) to highlight activities and achievements of Pakistani Community in Irish society.

See also

Foreign relations of Ireland
Foreign relations of Pakistan
Pakistani Irish Community Portal

References

 
Pakistan
Bilateral relations of Pakistan
Ireland and the Commonwealth of Nations